A Ministerial Broadcast, also known as a Prime Ministerial Broadcast or Ministerial Statement is a televised address to the British public, usually given by the incumbent Prime Minister or other senior Cabinet Minister in times of national crisis. The BBC and other public service broadcasters must give the government air time if the circumstances are seen to be of sufficient importance, and requests from opposition leaders must also be considered.

History

1950s 
The first Ministerial Broadcast was made by Prime Minister Anthony Eden on 27 April 1956, and broadcast on the BBC. It came several months after Eden's Conservative Party won the 1955 general election, which was the first time an election had received significant coverage on television. The address was different to a Party Political Broadcast, as the opposition parties were not allocated air-time as well. This was acceptable for non-controversial topics – the broadcast in April addressed the visit of Soviet leaders Nikita Khrushchev and Nikolai Bulganin – but in October 1956 Eden made a second televised speech relating to the Suez Crisis, to which the Leader of the Opposition Hugh Gaitskell demanded a reply. The BBC's guidelines on Ministerial Broadcasts had been published in 1947, and stated that:
They should deal with facts, explain legislation approved by parliament, or appeal for public co-operation.
If the opposition disagreed in any way with the government's broadcast (as Gaitskell did), they could ask permission to air a reply. In the case of the Suez Crisis, Eden refused to let Gaitskell give a reply, as he believed that the country should be united in times of conflict, and it would damage troops' morale if the government's efforts were put into question. The BBC Governors were then required to intervene, siding with Gaitskell, who was given permission to broadcast a reply. The Government were angry with the BBC's decision (especially as the BBC had earlier refused to let Australian Prime Minister Robert Menzies make a radio address in support of Eden due to fears of bias), and Eden threatened to cut the BBC's funding by £1 million, but after a protest from the Director-General of the BBC Ian Jacob and Chairman of the BBC Alexander Cadogan, the threat was eventually dropped.

Eden resigned as Prime Minister in January 1957 due to his poor handling of the Suez Crisis, and was succeeded by fellow Conservative Harold Macmillan. On 31 August 1959, Macmillan was joined by US President Dwight D. Eisenhower for a live television debate, the first of its kind. Eisenhower was on a tour of Europe, and discussed the need for global peace, as well as the Anglo-US relationship. There were initial concerns from Labour that the broadcast would affect their chances at the next general election, but these were  withdrawn and the broadcast went ahead as planned.

1960s 
After Labour defeated the Conservatives (then lead by Alec Douglas-Home) in the 1964 general election, the new Prime Minister Harold Wilson inherited a large deficit. Combined with a less-competitive economy, and a move away from using the pound as a reserve currency, the decision was taken in 1967 to reduce the exchange rate for the US dollar (which was at that time fixed) by 14% from $2.80 to $2.40 per pound. A statement was released on 18 November 1967 by Chancellor of the Exchequer James Callaghan explaining the reduction, as well as outlining a 2.5% rise in interest rates and cuts to the defence budget. The next day, Wilson made a televised broadcast to defend his decision, stating that:
From now on, the pound abroad is worth 14% or so less in terms of other currencies. That doesn't mean, of course, that the pound here in Britain, in your pocket or purse or in your bank, has been devalued. Wilson was widely mocked for his statement, and met fierce opposition by parliamentarians, including members of his own cabinet, such as Callaghan (who resigned from his post soon after), and his deputy George Brown.

Conservative leader Edward Heath later gave a reply, accusing the government of failing to safeguard the nation's money.

1970s 
Heath subsequently won the 1970 general election, but by 1973 he was facing constant industrial action by coal miners over pay. This led to measures to ration electricity, including implementing a three-day week. He was unable to resolve the mineworkers' dispute, and announced his intent to call a general election in a televised broadcast on 7 February 1974, stating: 
This time the strife has got to stop. Only you can stop it. It is time for you to speak, with your vote. Heath encouraged the mineworkers to pause the strike for the three-week campaign period, but he was not able to persuade them and they  continued the strike as planned. Harold Wilson was re-elected at the February election, and agreed a 'National Plan for Coal' to invest more in coalfields, stopping further industrial action.

Former Chancellor James Callaghan succeeded Wilson as Prime Minister in 1976, but lost the government's majority on his first day in office. Amid rising inflation and unemployment, Callaghan made a televised broadcast on 7 September 1978. It was widely expected that he would call an early general election, but in reality he chose to stay on for the full five-year term. He said that:  The government must and will continue to carry out policies that are consistent, determined, that don't chop or change and that brought about the present recovery in our fortunes.
His speech was strongly criticised by opposition leaders, with Liberal leader David Steel and Conservative leader Margaret Thatcher accusing Callaghan of "running scared".

Callaghan was eventually forced to 
call an election on 28 March 1979, after he lost a vote of no confidence in the House of Commons by a margin of one vote. This came after a series of strikes and economic unrest dubbed the Winter of Discontent, which severely damaged the government's popularity. The next day, he made a second statement defending the government's record, and officially announcing the general election. Opposition leader Margaret Thatcher made a response on 2 April (rescheduled from 31 March after the death of Airey Neave), ridiculing Callaghan's speech and encouraging the public to vote for her party at the election, which she went on to win.

1980s 
Margaret Thatcher did not give any further Ministerial Broadcasts in her time as Prime Minister, even in times of national crisis such as the Falklands War. In 1987 she was encouraged to give a broadcast about the spread of HIV/AIDS by Health Secretary Norman Fowler, but refused on the grounds of "bad taste".

1990s 

On 17 January 1991, John Major (who had succeeded Thatcher as Prime Minister the previous year) gave a broadcast about the decision to send British troops to fight in the Gulf War as part of Operation Desert Storm.

Major also gave a broadcast after signing the Downing Street Declaration on 15 December 1993, which affirmed the right of self-determination for the island of Ireland. In his statement, he said that Northern Ireland needed to:

Recent broadcasts

Iraq War 
There have been three ministerial broadcasts since the turn of the century. After Labour's landslide victory in the 1997 general election,  Tony Blair became Prime Minister. Blair made his first and only televised broadcast at 10.00pm on 20 March 2003. In his address, he announced that British troops had been sent to fight in the Iraq War:

COVID-19 pandemic 
The next broadcast was made 17 years later by Boris Johnson, on 23 March 2020. In his speech, Johnson announced a nationwide lockdown due to the COVID-19 pandemic, with the public ordered to stay at home and only leave for essential purposes:

His broadcast was shown at 8.30pm on BBC One, ITV, Channel 4, Channel 5, Sky News and the BBC News Channel, as well as on streaming service Amazon Prime, and attained overnight viewing figures of over 27 million, making one of the most most watched programmes in the history of British television.

Johnson made a second broadcast on 10 May 2020 to announce the easing of lockdown measures in England, but this was criticised as being "divisive, confusing and vague".

List of Prime Ministerial Broadcasts, Statements and Speeches

Other Broadcasts

In addition to those listed above, other ministerial broadcasts were given by Cabinet ministers concerning matters such as civil defence and employment rights. Details of broadcasts are taken from the BBC's Genome Project.

Budget Broadcasts 

The Chancellor of the Exchequer gave a broadcast each year from 1953 to explain the budget, an economic plan that sets out the government's spending and taxation plans for the year. A representative  of the main opposition party (usually the Shadow Chancellor of the Exchequer) would air a reply the next day, and from 1984 a spokesperson from the third-largest party in Parliament also made a response.

The broadcasts were scrapped by the BBC Trust in 2012, in favour of additional Party Political Broadcasts. The BBC defended its decision, saying that they originated from a time where filming the Budget Statement from inside the House of Commons was not possible, and the public would be able to access the information from various other outlets.

List of Budget Broadcasts

In popular culture 
An episode of the BBC satirical comedy Yes, Prime Minister ("The Ministerial Broadcast") features the main character Jim Hacker preparing for his first ministerial broadcast as Prime Minister.

See also 
 Royal address to the nation, a similar broadcast by the King.
 Oval Office address, a broadcast by the President of the United States
 Cadena nacional

Notes

References

External links 
Anthony Eden's broadcast on the Suez Crisis, at British Pathé
A Budget Broadcast by Roy Jenkins, at British Pathé
Transcript of Boris Johnson's Coronavirus broadcast on 23 March 2020, at GOV.UK
Transcript of Tony Blair's Iraq War broadcast on 20 March 2003, at the BBC

Speeches by heads of state
British television specials